KLWB (channel 50) is a television station licensed to New Iberia, Louisiana, United States, serving the Lafayette area as an affiliate of MeTV and Telemundo. The station is owned by Wilderness Communications, and maintains studios on Evangeline Thruway in Carencro; its transmitter is located on West Wilderness Trail in northern Lafayette Parish.

History
KLWB originated in 1999 as a cable-only affiliate of The WB, via The WB 100+. It was branded as "Acadiana's WB" and was known as "WB 2" and later "WB 10", based on its cable position. Its broadcast signal began broadcasting on April 3, 2006. Soon afterward, it began to be carried by DirecTV (which previously imported WBZL in Miami and WNUV in Baltimore for WB programming) and Dish Network. The station joined The CW upon its formation that September, carrying The WB 100+'s successor, The CW Plus.

KLWB lost its CW affiliation to a subchannel of KATC (channel 3) on June 14, 2010. At that time, the station switched to This TV (which had previously been carried on one of KLWB's subchannels, as well as on sister station KXKW-LD). The station also moved to channel 23 on Cox Cable (its previous position, channel 10, is now occupied by the KATC subchannel). On July 25, 2011, KLWB began airing MeTV on its main channel.

Beginning in fall 2011, KLWB became part of the Southland Conference Television Network, airing live sporting events from that league.

On March 30, 2012, Delta Media (Wilderness Communications) purchased then-RTV affiliate KDCG from Acadiana Cable Advertising and added the station on channel 50.2. On August 1, 2012, KDCG switched affiliations from RTV to Antenna TV and in the process Antenna TV was moved to 50.2, RTV was moved to 50.3 but was dropped from the lineup months later. On July 1, 2015, Heroes & Icons launched on 22.1 subchannel, (This TV on 22.2), and KLWB-DT2 stemming from an agreement between Delta Media Corporation and Weigel Broadcasting of Chicago and Antenna TV launched on KXKW-LD2. On July 1, 2016, American Sports Network, now Stadium was launched replacing This TV, which was also removed from KDCG-CD2, which remained silent until November 2019 when it began carrying MeTV (as a simulcast of KLWB) while that channel relocated its digital channel from 50 to 17. On November 30, 2019, KLWB relaunched its digital signal on channel 17, showing on channel 50 via PSIP. On March 15, 2021, Delta Media executives announced the addition of three new networks on its stations. Start TV launched on May 7 on KLWB-DT4. Cozi TV launched on June 14 on KLWB-DT5. Buzzr launched on sister station KDCG's third subchannel on January 21, 2022, maxing out capacity on all three owned stations.

Technical information

Subchannels
The station's digital signal is multiplexed:

Analog-to-digital conversion
KLWB shut down its analog signal, over UHF channel 50, on June 12, 2009, and "flash-cut" its digital signal into operation on channel 50. Because it was granted an original construction permit after the FCC finalized the DTV allotment plan on April 21, 1997, the station did not receive a companion channel for a digital television station.

References

External links

MeTV affiliates
Heroes & Icons affiliates
Telemundo network affiliates
Start TV affiliates
Cozi TV affiliates
Television channels and stations established in 1999
LWB (TV)
Iberia Parish, Louisiana
1999 establishments in Louisiana